Coutouvre is a commune in the Loire department in central France.

Population

Personalities
Coutouvre was the birthplace of:
 Jeanne-Marie Chavoin (1786-1818), co-founder of the Marist Sisters
 Claude Marie Dubuis (1817-1895), Catholic prelate
 Louis Mercier (1820-1875), translator of Jules Verne

See also
Communes of the Loire department

References

External links
 Official website
 Associations website
 Notre Dame de Prompt Secours (Ecole de Coutouvre) School website

Communes of Loire (department)